Giovanni Moscardini (1897–1985), also known as Johnny Moscardini, was an Italian Scottish footballer who played as a forward for Lucchese, Pisa, Genoa and  Italy. He was one of the earliest of the Oriundi. While the majority of these foreign-born footballers who played for Italy came from South America, Moscardini was the only one born in Scotland. He was born in Falkirk. The football stadium in Barga, Tuscany, where his family came from, is named in his honour.

Family
Moscardini’s father was one of three brothers who left their hometown of Barga in Tuscany in 1872 to move to Scotland. Once there they established several fish-and-chip shops and ice-cream parlours. In 1925 after retiring Moscardini’s father returned to Italy.

First World War
During the First World War, Moscardini left Scotland and enlisted in the Italian Army as a machine gunner. During the Battle of Caporetto, he was wounded in the elbow by shrapnel and was later sent to Sicily to recover. While there, he helped organise a football team.

Club career
When the war ended, Moscardini returned to his family home of Barga where he played football for the local team. He was subsequently spotted by a scout from Lucchese. After five years playing for Lucchese he switched to Pisa and during the 1924–25 season he scored 18 goals. He later played with Genoa and went on tour to South America with the club.

International career

Italy
Between 1921 and 1925 Moscardini made 9 appearances and scored 7 goals for Italy. He made his international debut against Switzerland on 6 November 1921 and scored in a 1–1 draw. Then on 15 January 1922 he scored twice in a 3–3 draw against Austria. On 21 May 1922 he scored again in a 4–2 win against Belgium. He scored his fifth international goal on 27 May 1923 in a 5–1 away defeat against Czechoslovakia. He made his last appearance for Italy against France on 22 March 1925 and he marked the occasion by scoring twice in a 7–0 win. Moscardini won his first eight caps while playing for Lucchese and his last while at Pisa He was the first Pisa player ever capped by Italy.

Later years
After retiring as a footballer Moscardini returned to Scotland to manage an uncle's shop in Campbeltown, also competing for a local amateur football team. He later established his own business, the Lake Café, in Prestwick. He lived in Prestwick until he died in 1985 at the age of 88.

Legacy
In 2016, renewed interest in Moscardini led to the creation of the Moscardini Cup, competed for by teams of writers from Scotland and Italy. The cup is currently held by Italy, after their 5–0 win at the Stadio Johnny Moscardini in Barga in 2016. Moscardini's years in Campbeltown are also the subject of a poem by Thomas Clark, titled O Johnny Moscardini!.

References

1897 births
1985 deaths
Footballers from Falkirk
Italian military personnel of World War I
Italian footballers
Italy international footballers
Pisa S.C. players
S.S.D. Lucchese 1905 players
People of Tuscan descent
People from Prestwick
Scottish expatriate footballers
Scottish expatriate sportspeople in Italy
Association football forwards
Scottish footballers
Citizens of Italy through descent